Sidney James (1891 – 9 April 1917) was an English professional footballer who played in the Football League for Huddersfield Town as a centre forward.

Personal life 
James served in The Duke of Wellington's (West Riding) Regiment and the King's Own Yorkshire Light Infantry during the First World War and held the rank of acting lance corporal. He was killed on 9 April 1917 during the capture of the village of Saint-Martin-sur-Cojeul. He was buried in Cojeul British Cemetery, Saint-Martin-sur-Cojeul.

Career statistics

References

1891 births
1917 deaths
Association football forwards
British military personnel killed in World War I
English footballers
Huddersfield Town A.F.C. players
Footballers from Sheffield
English Football League players
Association football wing halves
British Army personnel of World War I
Duke of Wellington's Regiment soldiers
King's Own Yorkshire Light Infantry soldiers